Blair Murray Davidson (born April 10, 1955) is a Canadian former professional ice hockey player who played in the World Hockey Association (WHA). Drafted in the third round of the 1975 NHL Amateur Draft by the Detroit Red Wings, Davidson opted to play in the WHA after being selected by the Phoenix Roadrunners in the third round of the 1975 WHA Amateur Draft. He played in two games for the Roadrunners during the 1976–77 WHA season. His son, Matt Davidson, played in the National Hockey League (NHL).

References

External links

1955 births
Canadian ice hockey defencemen
Detroit Red Wings draft picks
Flin Flon Bombers players
Ice hockey people from Manitoba
Living people
Manitoba Bisons ice hockey players
Oklahoma City Blazers (1965–1977) players
Phoenix Roadrunners draft picks
Phoenix Roadrunners (WHA) players
Tucson Mavericks players
Canadian expatriate ice hockey players in the United States